Dypsis dransfieldii is a species of flowering plant in the  Arecaceae family. It is a palm endemic to Madagascar that grows on white sands in lowland forest habitat. Populations are protected in Masoala National Park.

References

dransfieldii
Endemic flora of Madagascar
Endangered plants
Taxonomy articles created by Polbot
Plants described in 1995
Taxa named by Henk Jaap Beentje
Flora of the Madagascar lowland forests